Emily Mitchell  (born April 26, 1975) is an Anglo-American writer. Her debut novel, The Last Summer of the World, was published by W. W. Norton & Company in 2007. 
It concerns the photographer Edward Steichen  in the context of World War I and was a finalist for the 2008 Young Lions Award for fiction.

Life
She was educated at Middlebury College as an undergraduate (class of 1997) and lived for many years in New York City where she obtained her Master of Fine Arts at Brooklyn College (studying with Michael Cunningham).

Her writing has appeared in Guernica, The Indiana Review, AGNI, The Nation, and The Utne Reader.

She resided in San Francisco, California. 
She is currently an Associate Professor in the English Department at the University of Maryland.

Books
 The Last Summer of the World: A Novel W. W. Norton, 2007,

References

External links
 University of Maryland - faculty page
 "Five Serrated Dreams" (short story)
 Young Lions Award (New York Public Library)

1975 births
Living people
21st-century American novelists
American women novelists
21st-century English novelists
Writers from London
Middlebury College alumni
21st-century American women writers
University of Maryland, College Park faculty
Brooklyn College alumni
Writers from San Francisco
Novelists from New York (state)
Novelists from Maryland